The Unaweep Tabeguache Scenic Byway is a  Colorado Scenic and Historic Byway located in Mesa, Montrose, and San Miguel counties, Colorado, USA. The byway explores the Colorado Plateau canyon country of far western Colorado.

The Unaweep Tabeguache Scenic Byway connects with the San Juan Skyway Scenic and Historic Byway at Placerville.

Route

Gallery

See also

History Colorado
List of scenic byways in Colorado
Scenic byways in the United States

Notes

References

External links

America's Scenic Byways: Colorado
Colorado Department of Transportation
Colorado Scenic & Historic Byways Commission
Colorado Scenic & Historic Byways
Colorado Travel Map
Colorado Tourism Office
History Colorado

Colorado Scenic and Historic Byways
Uncompahgre National Forest
Transportation in Colorado
Transportation in Mesa County, Colorado
Transportation in Montrose County, Colorado
Transportation in San Miguel County, Colorado
Tourist attractions in Colorado
Tourist attractions in Mesa County, Colorado
Tourist attractions in Montrose County, Colorado
Tourist attractions in San Miguel County, Colorado
U.S. Route 50